Magdalis is a genus of wedge-shaped bark weevils in the family Curculionidae. There are at least 20 described species in Magdalis.

Species
 Magdalis aenescens LeConte, 1876 (bronze appletree weevil)
 Magdalis alutacea LeConte, 1878
 Magdalis armicollis (Say, 1824) (red elm bark weevil)
 Magdalis austera Fall, 1913
 Magdalis barbicornis (Latreille, 1804)
 Magdalis barbita (Say, 1831) (black elm bark weevil)
 Magdalis convexicollis Fall, 1913
 Magdalis cuneiformis Horn, 1873
 Magdalis gentilis LeConte, 1876
 Magdalis gracilis (LeConte, 1857)
 Magdalis hispoides LeConte, 1876
 Magdalis hockingensis Sleeper, 1955
 Magdalis imbellis (LeConte, 1857)
 Magdalis inconspicua Horn, 1873
 Magdalis lecontei Horn, 1873
 Magdalis morio Fall, 1913
 Magdalis olyra (Herbst, 1797)
 Magdalis pandura (Say, 1831)
 Magdalis perforata Horn, 1873
 Magdalis piceae Buchanan, 1934
 Magdalis proxima Fall, 1913
 Magdalis salicis Horn, 1873
 Magdalis striata Fall, 1913
 Magdalis subtincta LeConte, 1876
 Magdalis vitiosa Fall, 1913

References

 Alonso-Zarazaga, Miguel A., and Christopher H. C. Lyal (1999). A World Catalogue of Families and Genera of Curculionoidea (Insecta: Coleoptera) (Excepting Scotylidae and Platypodidae), 315.
 Poole, Robert W., and Patricia Gentili, eds. (1996). "Coleoptera". Nomina Insecta Nearctica: A Check List of the Insects of North America, vol. 1: Coleoptera, Strepsiptera, 41-820.

Further reading

 Arnett, R. H. Jr., M. C. Thomas, P. E. Skelley and J. H. Frank. (eds.). (21 June 2002). American Beetles, Volume II: Polyphaga: Scarabaeoidea through Curculionoidea. CRC Press LLC, Boca Raton, Florida .
 Arnett, Ross H. (2000). American Insects: A Handbook of the Insects of America North of Mexico. CRC Press.
 Richard E. White. (1983). Peterson Field Guides: Beetles. Houghton Mifflin Company.

External links

 NCBI Taxonomy Browser, Magdalis

Curculionidae